Ali bin Ali Douha was a citizen of Yemen described as an al Qaeda leader.
He was reported to have died during a raid by Yemeni security officials on August 9, 2007.
Qasim al Rimi and two other suspected militants were reported to have been killed during the raid.
Yemeni security officials are reported to have been tracking the suspects by helicopter 15 kilometers outside of Ma'rib.

According to the Arab News Ali bin Ali Douha and Qasim al Rimi "are believed to be among 10 Al-Qaeda fugitives suspected of having links to the July 2 suicide car bombing attack on a convoy of Spanish tourists near an archaeological site in Marib."

References

2007 deaths
Yemeni al-Qaeda members
Year of birth missing